Gideon "Gidi" Kliger (born March 30, 1980) is an Israeli Olympic sailor, who is a three-time bronze medallist at the sailing world championships.

Biography
Kliger was born in Tel Aviv, Israel. He started sailing and competing when he was 8 years old. He competes with the club Hapoel Tel Aviv. He competed with partner Udi Gal in two-man competitions through 2009.

In 1996 he and Gal won the 420 Europeans and finished second place at the 420 Worlds.
In 2000 he and Gal won the 470 Youth World Championship, and in 2001 they finished second place in the European Championship in Ireland.

He and Gal won bronze medals in the Sailing 470 World Championship for three years straight in Men's 470-Class Two-Person Dinghy — from 2006 to 2008. In May 2003, he was ranked number 1 in the world. In June 2007, he came in third place in the Men's 470 ISAF Sailing World Championships, in Cascais, Portugal. In January 2008, he and partner Gal came in third place in the Men 470 World Championships, in Melbourne, Australia. In April 2008, the pair was ranked third in the world in the 470 class dinghy.

Kliger and Gal competed on behalf of Israel at the 2004 Summer Olympics in Sailing at the 2004 Summer Olympics in Athens, Greece, and on behalf of Israel at the 2008 Summer Olympics in Sailing at the 2008 Summer Olympics in Beijing, China, in Men's 470-Class Two-Person Dinghy, coming in 15th and 14th place, respectively.

In 2009, Kliger began partnering with Israeli Eran Sela, a windsurfer from Sdot Yam, in the 470. In 2010, Kliger was ranked the # 2 skipper in the 470 by ISAF. In September 2010, they won a silver medal at the 470 class European Championship in Istanbul. In November 2010, the two won the gold medal in the Men's 470 at the Perth International Regatta. They won a bronze medal at the Open 470 European Championships. In 2011, they came in 4th place at the 470 World Championship, and in 7th at the 2012 World Championship.

In 2012, Kliger and Sela also competed at the 2012 Summer Olympics, finishing in 15th place.

See also
Sports in Israel

References

External links
 

1980 births
Living people
Israeli male sailors (sport)
Sailors at the 2004 Summer Olympics – 470
Sailors at the 2008 Summer Olympics – 470
Sailors at the 2012 Summer Olympics – 470
Sportspeople from Tel Aviv
Olympic sailors of Israel
Jewish sailors (sport)
Israeli Jews